In geometry, the small hexagrammic hexecontahedron is a nonconvex isohedral polyhedron. It is the dual of the small retrosnub icosicosidodecahedron. It is partially degenerate, having coincident vertices, as its dual has coplanar triangular faces.

Geometry

Its faces are hexagonal stars  with two short and four long edges. Each face has four long and two short edges. The ratio between the edge lengths is 
. 
The dihedral angle equals . Part of each face is inside the solid, hence is not visible in solid models.

References

External links
 

Dual uniform polyhedra